Andersdotter is a surname. Notable people with the surname include:

Amelia Andersdotter (born 1987), Swedish politician
Anna Andersdotter (floruit 1598), Swedish noble
Elin Andersdotter (died 1569), Swedish courtier
Magdalena Andersdotter (1590–1650), Norwegian shipowner

Swedish-language surnames